Thomas Addis Emmet, SJ August 23, 1873 – October 5, 1950) was an American-born bishop of the Catholic Church. He served as the Vicar Apostolic of Jamaica from 1930 to 1949.

Early life
Thomas Emmet was born in Boston, Massachusetts to Edward and Julia (O'Shaughnessy) Emmet. He received his primary and secondary education in Boston before enrolling in Boston College.

Emmet made his novitiate in Frederick, Maryland and professed vows in the Society of Jesus (Jesuits) on August 15, 1895. He continued his education at the College of the Sacred Heart in Woodstock, Maryland and was ordained a priest there by Cardinal James Gibbons of Baltimore on July 30, 1909.  He professed final vows on February 2, 1914.

Career
Emmet joined the faculty of Georgetown University in Washington, D.C. before joining the faculty of St. George's College in Kingston, Jamaica. He went to become the headmaster at Georgetown Preparatory School in North Bethesda, Maryland.

On July 3, 1930 Pope Pius XI appointed Emmet as the Titular Bishop of Tuscamia and Vicar Apostolic of Jamaica. He was consecrated a bishop by Cardinal William Henry O'Connell of Boston on September 21, 1930. The principal co-consecrators were Auxiliary Bishops John Bertram Peterson of Boston and John Michael McNamara of Baltimore.

He continued to serve as the Vicar Apostolic until his resignation was accepted by Pope Pius XII on April 8, 1949, for health reasons.

Death
He died in Boston at the age of 77 on October 5, 1950.

References

1873 births
1950 deaths
Clergy from Boston
Georgetown University faculty
19th-century American Jesuits
20th-century American Jesuits
Jesuit bishops
American Roman Catholic missionaries
Roman Catholic missionaries in Jamaica
20th-century Roman Catholic bishops in Jamaica
20th-century American Roman Catholic titular bishops
American Roman Catholic clergy of Irish descent
Jesuit missionaries
American expatriates in Jamaica